Lo Hsiang-lin (19 October, 1906 – 20 April, 1978) was one of the most renowned researchers in Hakka language and culture. His pioneering research in Hakka genealogy showed that the Hakka are Han Chinese.

Background
Lo Hsiang-lin was born in Xingning, Guangdong in 1906 and died in 1978. He attended Xingmin middle school, Tsinghua University, and Yenching University. From 1956–1968 he was a professor in Hong Kong University's Chinese department. In 1969, he became the first director of the Research Institute of Chinese Literature and History, Chu Hai College.

Hong Kong
In 1963, Lo Hsiang-lin was widely recognized for his depictions of Hong Kong as a center for cultural interchange between Eastern and Western civilizations, saying, "Friendship between nations, like friendship between persons, grows only where there is mutual respect and give and take."

References

Publications
 Hong Kong in the Cultural Interchange of East and West 
 History of Chinese Nationalities
 Dr. Sun Yat-sen's Family Lineage
 Introduction to Hakka Studies
 Study of Family Lineage in Hong Kong History
 客家源流考

1906 births
1978 deaths
Republic of China historians
20th-century Hong Kong historians
Academic staff of Chu Hai College of Higher Education
Hong Kong people of Hakka descent
Tsinghua University alumni
Chinese folklorists
Yenching University alumni
Academic staff of the University of Hong Kong
People from Xingning
Writers from Meizhou
Linguists from China
Scientists from Guangdong
Hakka scientists
Hakka writers
Historians from Guangdong
20th-century linguists